Patrick Tischler (born 20 February 1987) is an Austrian footballer. He left Austrian Bundesliga club Admira Wacker by mutual consent in February 2014 to pursue vocational training outside football.

References

Austrian footballers
Austrian Football Bundesliga players
FC Admira Wacker Mödling players
1987 births
Living people

Association football goalkeepers